Aghasi or Aghassi may refer to:

Given name
 Agasi Babayan or Aghasi Babayan (1908-1995), Armenian film director, screenwriter and actor
 Aghasi Khan (1731-1788), Second khan of Shirvan khanate
 Aghasi Khanjian (1901-1936), Soviet Armenian politician, Secretary of the Communist Party of Armenia
 Aghasi Mammadov (born 1980), Azerbaijani boxer
 Aghasi Manukyan (1967-2018), Armenian Greco-Roman wrestler

Surname
 Aref Aghasi (born 1997), Iranian footballer
 Haji Mirza Aqasi or Aghasi, Iranian politician, who served as the grand vizier of the Qajar king (shah) Mohammad Shah Qajar
 Ibrahim Pasha Qattar Aghasi, Ottoman statesman and wali
 Kizlar Aghasi, head of the eunuchs in the harem of the Ottoman Sultan
 Nematollah Aghasi (1939-2005), Iranian songer and songwriter

Others
Ashik Aghasi, a village on Iran
Kol Aghasi, a military rank in the Ottoman Army

See also 
 Agassi
 Agha (disambiguation)
 Aghasin (disambiguation)
 Aqasi